Dynamic Duo is a South Korean hip hop duo that consists of rappers Choiza and Gaeko. They rose to fame with their 2004 debut album, Taxi Driver, which became the best-selling Korean hip hop album ever. They are signed to Amoeba Culture, a hip hop record label that they founded in 2006.

History
Choiza and Gaeko were friends since childhood and debuted in 1999 with the hip hop trio CB Mass. The group released three albums before breaking up in 2003 after it was discovered that CB Mass' third member was stealing money from the group.

Dynamic Duo debuted the following year with the album, Taxi Driver. It became the best-selling hip hop album in South Korea, with sales of 50,000 copies in the first month after its release. Their second album, 2005's Double Dynamite, won Best Hip Hop Album at the 2006 Korean Music Awards.

After establishing hip hop record label Amoeba Culture in 2006, Dynamic Duo released their third album, Enlightened, in 2007. That year, they also won Best Music Video at the Mnet Asian Music Awards for their song, "Attendance Check." They released two more albums, 2008's Last Days and 2009's Band of Dynamic Brothers, before both Choiza and Gaeko began their mandatory military service on October 12, 2009. Before being dispatched, both received basic military training at the same camp in Uijeongbu in Gyeonggi Province.

Choiza and Gaeko have also individually produced and recorded their own singles through the 'NOWorkend' project- a series of singles that has come out of their label Amoeba Culture representing songs from the label's artists that shows a completely different side of themselves to their fans.

In 2013, their 7th full-length album titled "Lucky Numbers" was scheduled for release in July. The album featured artists such as Hyolyn of SISTAR, Primary, Zion.T and Supreme Team.

Their 8th album, "Grand Carnival" was released in November 2015.

Discography

Studio albums

Singles

Other charted songs

Awards and nominations

References

External links
Official Website

Musical groups established in 2003
South Korean hip hop groups
K-pop music groups
South Korean musical duos
Hip hop duos
Musical groups from Seoul
MAMA Award winners
Korean Music Award winners
Melon Music Award winners